Hyde is a town in Tameside, Greater Manchester, England, which had a population of 34,003 in 2011.

History

Early history
Newton Hall was present in the thirteenth century. The area formed a township of the parish of St Mary, Stockport. Its name is derived from the Hide, a measure of land for taxation purposes, taken to be that area of land necessary to support a peasant family. In the late 18th century the area that was to become the town centre was no more than a cluster of houses known as Red Pump Street. Gee Cross was much larger and 'Hyde' was still only used to refer to the estates of Hyde Hall on the banks of the River Tame. Altogether there were only 3,500 inhabitants in the district in 1801. The town is largely a creation of the 19th century and the Industrial Revolution.

Industrial Revolution

The population of Hyde increased due to the success of the cotton mills during the Industrial Revolution of the late 18th and early 19th centuries, at one stage there were 40 working mills. By 1872 only 27 remained, half of the remaining mills closed between 1921 and 1939 and there is only one working mill in the town today. There were many mill owning families, including the Sidebotham, Hibbert and Horsfield families. The main employers in the mills were the Ashton family who successfully ran a combined spinning and weaving company. Most mills concentrated on one process only. The Ashton family built Hyde Chapel on Stockport Road, Gee Cross. The Ashton Brothers' Mill has recently been demolished to make way for a housing estate.

St George's Church was built in 1832 as a chapel of ease to St Mary's, Stockport. It was built at the instigation of John Hyde Clarke of Hyde Hall and was the first Church of England place of worship in the town. St George's became the parish church of part of Hyde township in 1842. Later additions include the lychgate, boathouse by the canal, hearse house, parish rooms and numerous vicarages. The church has a  tower housing eight bells and a clock.

The Peak Forest Canal was constructed through Hyde from Ashton-under-Lyne to Woodley, Romiley and Marple. Captain Clarke's Bridge, originally named Wood End Canal Bridge is situated at the end of Woodend Lane. The bridge was erected before Captain Clarke rose to prominence and therefore probably became known as Captain Clarke's Bridge after he retired and resided there.

There was also a coal mine, known as Hyde Colliery, in the town and in January 1889 an explosion there killed 23 miners. There was an enquiry held the following month at Hyde Town Hall. The following month Ardwick AFC, modern day Manchester City, played Newton Heath, modern day Manchester United, under floodlights at Belle Vue to raise money for the victims' families. The game was watched by 10,000 people and this was the first floodlit match played by either side.

20th century
During the 1960s, Myra Hindley and Ian Brady were arrested in their home on the Hattersley estate in Hyde after police found the body of 17-year-old Edward Evans in the house. At their trial they were found guilty of murdering Evans as well as two other children whose bodies were found buried on Saddleworth Moor several miles away.

Britain's most prolific serial killer, Dr Harold Shipman, had his doctor's surgery in the town where he murdered most of his several hundred victims. The first known victim was 86-year-old Sarah Hannah Marsland of Ashton House in Victoria Street on 7 August 1978 and the last was Kathleen Grundy of Joel Lane on 24 June 1998.

21st century

On 18 September 2012, drug dealer Dale Cregan made a hoax emergency call to the police from an address in Mottram in Longdendale, luring Police Constables Nicola Hughes, 23, and Fiona Bone, 32, of Greater Manchester Police there by claiming that there had been an incident of criminal damage. When they arrived, he murdered them.

Governance

Civic history

Hyde was incorporated as a municipal borough of Cheshire in 1881, which covered the parishes of Hyde, Godley and Newton, along with part of Compstall. In 1936, the borough was extended by the annexation of the civil parish of Hattersley and part of the civil parish of Matley from Tintwistle Rural District. The whole of the municipal borough became part of the Metropolitan Borough of Tameside, Greater Manchester in 1974, under the Local Government Act 1972.

Hyde Town Hall dominates the market place area. The large bell in the clocktower is known as Owd Joss (Old Josh), named after Joshua Bradley, a former poor child worker in the mills. Michael Bradbury built it The clock chimes the Westminster Quarters.

Parliamentary representation

As a county palatine, Cheshire was unrepresented in Parliament until the Chester and Cheshire (Constituencies) Act 1542. From 1545, Cheshire was represented by two Knights of the Shire. On the passage of the Great Reform Act of 1832, the area of Hyde was included in the North Cheshire constituency. Between the passing of the Second Reform Act of 1867 and the Redistribution of Seats Act 1885, the town was part of the East Cheshire constituency. Between 1885 and 1918 the town was part of the Hyde county constituency. Since the 1918 general election, the town has been represented in Parliament by the member for the Stalybridge and Hyde county constituency. The current Member of Parliament is Jonathan Reynolds.

Geography

Werneth Low Country Park is the location of the Hyde War Memorial. The memorial is owned by a trust which raised funds from Hyde residents after the Great War to create a permanent memorial to those Hyde residents who died in that conflict. The memorial contains 710 names.

Hyde is separated from Denton by the River Tame, a tributary of the River Mersey. There are several areas and suburbs in Hyde, these include: Gee Cross, Newton, Hattersley, Godley, and Flowery Field.

Transport

Hyde is served by six railway stations:
 Hyde Central and Hyde North stations are on the Manchester Piccadilly - Romiley - Rose Hill Marple Hyde Loop line;
 Flowery Field, Newton for Hyde, Godley and Hattersley stations are on the electrified Piccadilly - Glossop - Hadfield line.

Hyde is served by the M67 motorway, which is a feeder to the M60 which is the orbital motorway for Manchester and is connected to many other motorways that serve across the country.

Hyde also has Hyde bus station, with services into Manchester and other surrounding areas, including Stockport, Ashton-under-Lyne and Oldham. The bus station was originally built in the 1960's with an open 'bus shelter design' like many bus stations, but was rebuilt as a much larger central terminus style building, enclosed from the outside. It opened on 23 August 2007 and cost £3.7m to build. The initiative was intended to encourage people to use public transport. Bus 201 runs between Hattersley and Manchester city centre, via Hyde, Denton and Gorton. Bus 202 runs between Gee Cross and Manchester city centre, via Hyde, Haughton Green, Denton and Gorton. Bus 330 runs between Ashton-under-Lyne and Stockport, via Dukinfield and Hyde. Bus 341 runs between Glossop and Hyde, via Charlesworth, Mottram-in-Longdendale, Hattersley and Hyde Hospital. Bus 342 runs between Hyde and Gee Cross, via Hyde Hospital. Bus 343 runs between Hyde and Oldham, via Dukinfield, Stalybridge, Carrbrook, Mossley and Lees. Bus 344 runs between Hyde and Hyde Hospital, via Backbower. Bus 346 runs between Ashton-under-Lyne and Gee Cross, via Dukinfield, Newton and Hyde.

A tram network operated by the SHMD Joint Board ran lines through Hyde from 1904 to 1945, until their replacement by buses. The second-generation tramway Manchester Metrolink currently terminates at nearby Ashton-under-Lyne for connections to the city centre.

Sport

Football

Hyde United F.C. was formed in 1919 and changed its name to Hyde FC in 2010, as a result of a sponsorship deal with Manchester City, and back to Hyde United in 2015. The club plays its home games at Ewen Fields. The ground has been used by Manchester City and Manchester United for their reserve team fixtures; in 2010, Manchester City F.C. Reserves and Academy moved in. They used the facility as their permanent home until 2015, when a purpose-built academy stadium was opened on the campus at the Etihad Stadium. A notable appearance for Hyde United F.C. was in the FA Cup - in the 2017–18 season, they made a first round appearance in the FA Cup where they lost 4–0 to Milton Keynes Dons FC.

Boxing

World champion boxer Ricky Hatton was brought up on the Hattersley Estate and now lives in Gee Cross. He fought against Floyd Mayweather Jr. and Manny Pacquiao, but lost on both occasions. Overall his record is 45-3, and at one point was 43–0. His association with the town led to the creation of a boxing gym and health club by Hatton Promotions.

Water polo
The Hyde Seal Swimming & Water Polo Club dominated water polo and swimming in England in the early years of the 20th century.

Cricket
Hyde Cricket and Squash Club play in the Cheshire County League and have their ground near Werneth Low. Flowery Field Cricket Club are part of the Lancashire County League. Professional cricketer Len Hopwood was born in Newton.

Education

Primary schools
Below is a list of all the primary schools in the Hyde area:
St Paul's R.C. School & Nursery, a Catholic Primary school, first opened in the early 1900s, it was rebuilt in the early 1970s & a plaque from the original building has been preserved.
Bradley Green Community Primary School was built in 1968.
Oakfield Primary School
St George's C.E Primary School, the original building was built in 1836.
Dowson Primary School
Godley Community Primary School, was built in 1978.
Flowery Field Primary School, was built in 2015 due to a poor design of the old building
Leigh Primary School
Greenfield Primary School, was built in 1998.
St James' Catholic Primary School
Gee Cross Holy Trinity Primary School

Secondary schools
Below is a list of all the secondary schools in the Hyde area:

Alder Community High School
Hyde High School

Further education
Tameside College and Clarendon Sixth Form College used to be located in Hyde but have since moved to Ashton-under-Lyne.

Leisure

Hyde's largest greenspace is Hyde Park, originally part of the Newton Lodge estate which was purchased by James Ashton circa 1620. The Ashton family were cotton mill owners and one of the two biggest employers in Hyde. The park was given to the Borough of Hyde by Eveline Mary Ashton and Amy Elizabeth Ashton in 1902 and opened to the public on 21 May 1904. The bandstand opened in 1922 and in 1938 Newton Lodge was demolished and replaced by Bayley Hall. The park features a garden of tranquillity, a children's play area and a rockery.

Hyde Market has been a shopping centre for centuries. In 1994, Clarendon Square Shopping Centre opened alongside the market. Outside the shopping centre is a children's carousel ride which celebrated its 100th birthday on 6 July 2019.

Hyde's Festival Theatre is home to several local amateur groups presenting plays, music and dance in the downstairs auditorium or the upstairs smaller studio. There are occasional visiting professional shows.

Hyde leisure centre contains a large swimming pool with a wave machine, aqua slide and upstairs fitness suite. The octagon shaped structure, which has been open since the 1990s, is next to Hyde United F.C.'s ground. Waldorf Playing Fields are adjacent to Matley Lane in Hyde.

Hyde also has an Air Cadet Organisation (ACO), No. 468 (Hyde & Hattersley) Squadron.

Hyde Library had a gallery exhibiting the work of Harry Rutherford, an artist from the Tameside area, now at Ashton-under-Lyne.

Notable people

The following individuals were born in Hyde or lived in the town:
Luke Baines, actor, singer and model
Trevor Grimshaw, artist
Stuart Hall, BBC radio and television presenter.
Ricky Hatton, boxer
Matthew Hatton, boxer
Lee Martin, former Manchester United footballer
Jenny Campbell, former British banker and panelist on Dragons' Den
L.S. Lowry, artist.
Harold Shipman, serial killer
Ian Brady and Myra Hindley, "Moors Murderers", serial killers
Alan West (born 1951 in Hyde), footballer, central midfielder for Burnley and Luton Town
Danny Brocklehurst (born 1971 in Hyde), BAFTA-winning screenwriter, Shameless, Clocking Off, Talk to Me.
Tom Cassell (born 23 June 1993 in Hyde)
Owen Jones, writer and journalist.
Ron Hill MBE (25 September 1938 – 23 May 2021, born in Accrington, but later lived in Hyde) running legend who also worked in sports clothing.
Timmy Mallett, children's TV presenter. Ex-Hyde Grammar School pupil.
Brian & Michael, chart success singers. Ex-Hyde Grammar School pupils.

In popular culture
In fiction, Hyde is mentioned frequently in the BBC drama Life on Mars. In the programme, the character Sam Tyler was said to have transferred from C Division Hyde, to the City Centre, A Division CID. The choice of Hyde is given as a clue that his 1973 self is an alter ego, as in Robert Louis Stevenson's Strange Case of Dr Jekyll and Mr Hyde.

The dance scene from the film Yanks (1979), which starred Richard Gere, was filmed in Hyde Town Hall.

See also

Listed buildings in Hyde, Greater Manchester

References
Notes

Bibliography

External links

Hyde History at Tameside Council Website

 
Towns in Greater Manchester
Unparished areas in Greater Manchester
Geography of Tameside